Carn Kenidjack is a hill in Tregeseal, Cornwall, England, UK. It is covered in megaliths including Tregeseal East stone circle.

A tale is told that two miners returning home one night witnessed a wrestling match near Carn Kenidjack, which was presided over by the Devil. When one of the demon wrestlers was wounded, they whispered a prayer in his ear, and the entire spectacle disappeared.

Notes

Archaeological sites in Cornwall
Hills of Cornwall
St Just in Penwith